Heritage College Lake Macquarie (est. 1997) is a Christadelphian K-12 school located at Morisset, New South Wales, Australia.

Heritage College Lake Macquarie is one of five Christadelphian Heritage Colleges in Australia; the other four are located in Perth, Adelaide, Melbourne and  Sydney.

The school motto is "To Know Wisdom and Instruction", which is taken from the Book of Proverbs 1:2.

The school was established in 1997 in a leased site in Cooranbong. In 2013 the new site in Morisset was opened and the school has steadily grown in size since then.

See also 

 Heritage Colleges (Australia)

References

External links 
 Heritage College Lake Macquarie

Private schools in New South Wales
C
Christadelphian organizations
1997 establishments in Australia